Archie Pitt (1882 – 12 November 1940) was a British music hall performer, showman and talent agent. He is best known for his marriage to Gracie Fields whose career he managed.

Selected filmography

Actor
 Danny Boy (1934)
 Barnacle Bill (1935)
 Excuse My Glove (1936)

Screenwriter
 Sally in Our Alley (1931)
 Looking on the Bright Side (1932)
 [[Boys Will Be Boys (1932 film)]]

References

Bibliography
 Babington, Bruce.  British Stars and Stardom: From Alma Taylor to Sean Connery. Manchester University Press, 2001.

External links

1882 births
1940 deaths
British male stage actors
British male film actors
British Jews